In mathematics, a direct limit of groups is the direct limit of a  of groups. These are central objects of study in algebraic topology, especially stable homotopy theory and homological algebra. They are sometimes called stable groups, though this term normally means something quite different in model theory. 

Certain examples of stable groups are easier to study than "unstable" groups, the groups occurring in the limit. This is  surprising, given that they are generally infinite-dimensional, constructed as limits of groups with finite-dimensional representations.

Examples 

Bott periodicity computes the homotopy of the stable unitary group and stable orthogonal group.

Stable homotopy groups of spheres are the stable groups associated with the suspension functor.

See also

References 

Homotopy theory
Homological algebra
Algebraic topology